Heather Rankin (born April 30, 1965) is a Canadian curler from Calgary. While living in Nova Scotia, she won the provincial junior championships in 1984 and would skip the Nova Scotia team at the Canadian Junior Curling Championships. In 1990 she won the Nova Scotia provincial championships sending her to that year's Tournament of Hearts.  She skipped the Nova Scotia team to a 9-2 record in her debut winning the all-star skip award, but lost the final to Ontario, skipped by Alison Goring.

Rankin returned to the Tournament of Hearts once again in 1993, playing third for Colleen Jones. The team finished with a 6-5 record 1 game out of the playoffs.

Rankin moved to Calgary c. 1997 to start a computer consulting business with her husband. Since the move, she tried unsuccessfully to win that province's championship with a runner up finish at the 2001 Alberta Scott Tournament of Hearts. She continued to be a top curler, and played in the 2001 Canadian Olympic Curling Trials, three Players' Championships and two Canada Cups.

Rankin has not curled competitively since 2011.

Personal life
She graduated from Bridgewater High School (Nova Scotia) and Acadia University, and served as vice-president of the management consulting firm Scotia Consulting Inc. Her specialization is business analysis and project management consulting for oil and gas, specializing in data and software engineering. She has a son, born ca. 2007. At the time of the 1990 Hearts, she was a computer technician, and an avid video game player.

Grand Slam record

Former events

References

External links
 

Canadian women curlers
Curlers from Nova Scotia
Living people
Curlers from Calgary
Sportspeople from Halifax, Nova Scotia
1965 births